Ayalaan is an upcoming Indian Tamil-language science fiction comedy film directed by R. Ravikumar, and produced by Kotapadi J. Rajesh under KJR Studios. It stars Sivakarthikeyan, Rakul Preet Singh, Sharad Kelkar and Isha Koppikar. The music is composed by A. R. Rahman and cinematography handled by Nirav Shah while editing is done by Ruben.

Cast 
Sivakarthikeyan as Raghu
Rakul Preet Singh
Sharad Kelkar
Isha Koppikar
Bhanupriya
Yogi Babu
Karunakaran
Bala Saravanan

Production

Development 
On 16 October 2016, Sivakarthikeyan and his former manager-turned-producer R. D. Raja of 24AM Studios, announced their next project, which will be helmed by director R. Ravikumar, in his second directorial post the release of Indru Netru Naalai (2015). Sivakarthikeyan stated, "It's going to be a very ambitious project. It needs to be made on a bigger scale, and hence, it will take time before it goes on floors". Ravikumar had to enhance the script of the science-fiction film, which took more than a year, to finalise the pre-production works. In the meantime, Sivakarthikeyan decided to concentrate on Velaikkaran as well as Ponram's Seemaraja, both produced by Raja.

Post the completion of Velaikkaran, Sivakarthikeyan announced that he will officially collaborate with director Ravikumar, for the project after completing the scripting works. It was reported that the project will be made on a lavish scale, with top technicians being brought in for the project. In mid-January 2018, Sivakarthikeyan further announced that he will start the shooting of the film only after completing the production works of Seemaraja. The project was reportedly produced by R. D. Raja, the actor's former manager under his banner 24AM Studios. On 15 January 2018, it was announced that A. R. Rahman will compose music for the film, in his maiden collaboration with Sivakarthikeyan. Sivakarthikeyan described it as a "dream come true" moment, on associating with Rahman for the first time. The makers hired veteran cinematographer Nirav Shah as part of the technical crew. Rakul Preet Singh was chosen for the female lead in February 2018, collaborating with Sivakarthikeyan for the first time. In April 2018, Yogi Babu and Karunakaran were reported to be a part of the film's cast.

In mid-July 2019, Raja decided to back out producing the film under his own banner 24AM Studios, and Sivakarthikeyan himself decided to lend financial support for the film, by producing it under his own banner Sivakarthikeyan Productions. However, when the project was revived in November 2018, KJR Studios had decided to cash in the shares of Raja's productions, including this project. The company eventually went on to co-produced and distribute the film along with 24AM Studios, but 24AM Studios backed out later. The makers announced the film's title as Ayalaan on 3 February 2020.

Filming 
Principal shooting of the film began on 27 June 2018, preceded by a launch event in Chennai. Sivakarthikeyan and Singh attended the event, with Bhanupriya, Kothandam and Bala Saravanan, were present during the event with other cast and crew members. Following the launch, the film's team headed to Gokulam Studios for a brief schedule. Nirav Shah used the Alexa LF camera, used in a number of acclaimed Hollywood films, thus becoming a first Indian film to be shot using Alexa LF. During the start of the shoot Bollywood actress Isha Koppikar, was signed in for a pivotal role marking her return to Tamil cinema, a decade after her 2001 film Narasimha, who also joined the shooting sets in July 2018. Sharad Kelkar was also reported to play a pivotal role in the film, making his Tamil debut. Major portions of the film were shot in Chennai.

The shooting of the film was put on hold due to financial issues, as well as Sivakarthikeyan's commitments in other projects. On 18 February 2019, Sivakarthikeyan had resumed the shooting of the film in Chennai. However, Sivakarthikeyan's involvement in the shooting of Mr. Local, Namma Veettu Pillai and Hero, delayed the project further. Adding to these reasons was the financial issues, surrounding Raja's production house, 24AM Studios, which led Raja backing out of the project, and Sivakarthikeyan himself decided to lend financial support for the film, by producing it under his own banner.

The project was later revamped on 20 September 2019, after Sivakarthikeyan sorted out the financial issues surrounding between the producers and the financiers. He further decided to forgo his renumeration, in order to complete the film's shoot. He initially revealed that 75% of the film's shooting has been completed, and the remaining portions will be shot within 25–30 days. The shooting resumed on 29 January 2020, with the film's team being present in Chennai. On 9 February 2020, a report claimed that the film's team worked for 15 hours to shoot the climax sequence.

The film's shooting further affected due to the COVID-19 pandemic. In July 2020, the makers reported that Sivakarthikeyan will join the shooting of the film, after wrapping his commitments with Doctor (2021). Later, the makers commenced the final leg of the shoot on 26 November 2020, with minimal crew, adhering to the guidelines imposed by the government. A special team was designated, to observe the crew, including the director and the actor abiding the COVID-19 protocol. Koppikar and Kelkar arrived in Chennai, to join the film's shoot. The final schedule took place for two months to shoot. It was reported that the makers planned to shoot a special song in Chennai, featuring 600 dancers in background, which will mark the film's wrap after its completion. The makers planned to shoot the song within 10 days. On 24 January 2021, the makers announced that the shooting of the film has been wrapped. Reshoots began in November 2022.

Visual effects 
Unlike many American films and the Hindi film Koi... Mil Gaya (2003), where a human actor portrays an alien after wearing prosthetics, the alien in Ayalaan was created entirely through visual effects. During filming, the makers used a boy as a stand-in for the alien so that Sivakarthikeyan, whose character interacts with the alien in several scenes, would have a reference point. According to Ravikumar, it was a challenge to synchronise this on the visual effects screen. In January 2021, it was reported that the makers need more than 10 months to complete the visual effects, and the makers spent more than  crore on them.

Music 
The film's soundtrack and background score are composed by A. R. Rahman, which marks his first collaboration with Sivakarthikeyan and R. Ravikumar. Rahman agreed to do the picture in late-2017 and eventually began the music sittings and composition in March 2018. Despite the delay in the film's shoot, Rahman had completed composing three songs for the film, apart from singing the intro song, after Sivakarthikeyan's request. On the occasion of Sivakarthikeyan's birthday (17 February 2021), the film's first single "Vera Level Sago" was released online and in the official YouTube channel of Sony Music South, which acquired the film's audio rights. The song had vocals by Rahman with lyrics written by Vivek. The second single is "Thambi Alien".

Release 
As of December 2021, Ayalaan was facing uncertainty over its release due to 24AM Studios borrowing  from Tag Entertainment, and the Madras High Court granted a stay over its release till 3 January 2022 unless the sum was repaid.

References

External links 

Film productions suspended due to the COVID-19 pandemic
Films postponed due to the COVID-19 pandemic
Films scored by A. R. Rahman
Films with live action and animation
Indian films with live action and animation
Indian science fiction comedy films
Upcoming Tamil-language films